The Women's 10 kilometre freestyle was part of the FIS Nordic World Ski Championships 2007's events held in Sapporo, Japan. The race went underway on 27 February 2007 at 15:00 CET at Shirahatayama cross-country course in Sapporo. The defending world champion was Czech Republic's Katerina Neumannova.

Results 

1Disqualified due to skier did not ski the entire marked course.

References

External links
Final results (FIS)

FIS Nordic World Ski Championships 2007
2007 in women's sport